Senjanak or Sanjanak, also rendered as Sinjanak or Sindzhanak, may refer to:
 Sanjanak, Fars
 Senjanak, Qazvin